Rajendra Pareek (born 5 February 1948 in Sikar district of Rajasthan) has been a member of the 9th, 10th, 11th and 13th and elected again this time for 15th Rajasthan Legislative Assembly  , where he has sat as a supporter of the Indian National Congress party. He is also popularly known as Raju Pareek or Raju Bhaiya in his constituency.

Education and early career 
Rajendra Pareek was born on 5 February 1948 as the second son of Bhanwar Lal Pareek and Durga Devi. He graduated with a B.Com degree from the University of Rajasthan in 1972. He became interested in politics as a student.

Before entering politics, Pareek worked in Kolkata for the B. K. Birla Group. He left Kolkata in July 1976 and in 1978 he started a woollen carpet manufacturing business at Sikar. That business closed in 1992.

Pareek is married to Veena Pareek and has two children.

Political career 
Pareek was General Secretary of Sikar District Congress Committee (1984-1990) before winning his first election to the Rajasthan Legislative Assembly from the Sikar constituency in 1990. He became a member of the All India Congress Committee after that election and he won the Sikar seat again in the elections of 1993 and 1998.. He was nominated as General Secretary of Rajasthan Pradesh Congress Committee in 2004. In the elections of 2008, he again won from Sikar. He lost to candidates of the Bharatiya Janata Party in the 2003 and 2013 elections.

Pareek was appointed Minister of Industries, Public Undertaking, Economics and Statistics, Excise, NRIs on 28 February 2009. He was given additional charge of Mines and Petroleum in November 2011. He was also given additional charge of the Waters Resources ministry for a short time.

Pareek has twice refused to eat cereals for an extended period of time. The first occasion lasted 14 months and was connected to demands for the building of Zanana Hospital in Sikar; the second occasion saw him abstain for 27 months in support of construction of a railway overbridge connecting the localities of Sikar. His abstentions ended when both projects were begun.

, he is an Executive Member of Rajasthan Pradesh Congress Committee.

References

External links 

1948 births
Living people
Indian National Congress politicians
Rajasthan MLAs 1993–1998
Rajasthan MLAs 1990–1992
Rajasthan MLAs 1998–2003
Rajasthan MLAs 2008–2013